Westville is an unincorporated community in Placer County, California. It lies at an elevation of 5249 feet (1600 m).

The Westville post office operated from 1889 to 1919. The name honors the first postmaster, George C. West.

References

Unincorporated communities in California
Unincorporated communities in Placer County, California